The 1925 Maryland Aggies football team represented the University of Maryland in the 1925 college football season. In their 15th season under head coach Curley Byrd, the Aggies compiled a 3–5 record (0–4 in conference), finished in a tie for last place in the Southern Conference, and were outscored by their opponents 82 to 53.

Schedule

References

Maryland
Maryland Terrapins football seasons
Maryland Aggies football